The 1995 Minnesota Golden Gophers football team represented the University of Minnesota in the 1995 NCAA Division I-A football season. In their fourth year under head coach Jim Wacker, the Golden Gophers compiled a 3–8 record and were outscored by their opponents by a combined total of 368 to 272.

Offensive guard Todd Jesewitz and linebacker Broderick Hall (American football) were named All-Big Ten second team.  Defensive back Justin Conzemius was named Academic All-American second team.   Kicker Mike Chalberg, defensive back Justin Conzemius, defensive tackle Troy Duerr, offensive lineman Chris Fowlkes, linebacker Peter Hiestand, offensive lineman Todd Jesewitz, quarterback Rob Jones, wide receiver Tony Levine, defensive tackle Antoine Richard, linebacker Craig Sauer, quarterback Cory Sauter, linebacker Jim Tallman, defensive end Dave Watson, linebacker Parc Williams and long snapper Scott Williams were named Academic All-Big Ten.

Craig Sauer was awarded the Bronko Nagurski Award and Carl Eller Award.  Cory Sauter was awarded the Bruce Smith Award.  Mike Chalberg was awarded the Bobby Bell Award.  Justin Conzemius was awarded the Butch Nash Award.  Running back Chris Darkins was awarded the Paul Giel Award.

Total home attendance for the season was 291,173, which averaged out to 48,529 per game.  The season high for attendance was against Wisconsin.

Schedule

Roster

Game summaries

Ball State

Syracuse

Arkansas State

Purdue

Northwestern

Michigan State

Michigan

Ohio State

Wisconsin

Illinois

Iowa

References

Minnesota
Minnesota Golden Gophers football seasons
Minnesota Golden Gophers football